Edward Ellerker (c. 1537 – 28 December 1586), of Risby, near Beverley, Yorkshire, was an English politician.

Family
Ellerker's mother and wife were both of the Constable family. His father-in-law was the MP for Yorkshire, Sir Robert Constable. Ellerker was married to Elizabeth Constable, and they had four or five sons.

Career
He was a Member (MP) of the Parliament of England for Beverley in 1571.

References

1537 births
1586 deaths
English MPs 1571
People from Beverley